The women's 60 metres event at the 1966 European Indoor Games was held on 27 March in Dortmund.

Medalists

Results

Heats
First 2 from each heat (Q) and the next 4 fastest (q) qualified for the semifinals.

Semifinals
First 2 from each heat (Q) and the next 2 fastest (q) qualified for the final.

Final

References

60 metres at the European Athletics Indoor Championships
60